Giuseppe Zinetti (born 22 June 1958) is an Italian former professional football manager and former player, who played as a goalkeeper.

Career
Zinetti was born in Leno. Throughout his club career, he played for Italian sides Imola (1976–1977), Bologna (1977–1987), Triestina (on loan during the 1983–84 season), Pescara (1987–1990), and Roma (1990–1993), where he usually served as the club's second goalkeeper behind Giovanni Cervone; with Roma, he won the Coppa Italia in 1991, before ending his career with Ascoli in Serie B, where he was the club's second goalkeeper, retiring at the conclusion of the 1993–94 season.

Style of play
Regarded as one of the best Italian goalkeepers of his generation, Zinetti was an athletic and reliable shot-stopper, who was known for his efficient rather than spectacular playing style, as well as his handling, his speed when rushing off his line, and his ability to come out and claim crosses.

Honours
Roma
 Coppa Italia: 1990–91

References

1958 births
Living people
Italian footballers
Italy under-21 international footballers
Association football goalkeepers
Serie A players
Serie B players
Bologna F.C. 1909 players
U.S. Triestina Calcio 1918 players
Delfino Pescara 1936 players
A.S. Roma players
Ascoli Calcio 1898 F.C. players
Imolese Calcio 1919 players